Elena Donazzan (born 22 June 1972 in Bassano del Grappa) is an Italian politician from Veneto.

A member of National Alliance (and, prior to that, of the party Italian Social Movement), she was elected to the Regional Council of Veneto in the 2000 regional election.

Re-elected in 2005, she served as regional minister of Education in Galan III Government (2005–2010). Re-elected in 2010 for The People of Freedom, in 2015 for Forza Italia and in 2020 for the Brothers of Italy, she was appointed minister of Education, Formation, Labour and Equal Opportunities in Zaia I Government (2010–2015), Zaia II Government (2015–2020) and Zaia III Government (2020–present). She is thus the longest serving regional minister in Venetian politics.

She sang a fascist anthem ("Faccetta nera") during the radio broadcast "La zanzara" the eighth of January 2021.

References

Living people
1972 births
National Alliance (Italy) politicians
Members of the Regional Council of Veneto